Eupithecia multistrigata is a moth in the family Geometridae first described by George Duryea Hulst in 1896. It is widespread in western North America, including the states and provinces of Alberta, Arizona, California, Colorado, Idaho, Montana, Nevada, New Mexico, Oregon, Saskatchewan, Utah, Washington and Wyoming.

The wingspan is about 20 mm.

References

Moths described in 1896
multistrigata
Moths of North America